Titan the Robot (often referred to as Titan) is developed by the British company Cyberstein Robots. It is approximately 8 feet tall and weighs  which increases to  including the cart it rides on and onboard equipment. It is a costume enhanced by various actuators and electronic devices, resembling a humanoid robot, that is worn by an actor who moves the appendages of the costume and controls electronic functions like sound effects from the inside of the costume.

The robot was designed by Nik Fielding, who runs Cyberstein from Newquay, Cornwall, England. Titan has performed at a variety of public and private events, such as the Commonwealth Games, Bar Mitzvahs UK shopping centres, television fundraisers and live concerts. Entered the Chinese market in 2018 and operated by Tuxuan Robotics.

Filmography

Live performances

2004 
 Glastonbury Festival, held on 25–27 June near Pilton, Somerset, England. The first public appearance of Titan.

2009 

 14 June - South of England Show Ardingly

2010 
 February - Brighton Model World. Titan appeared at the Brighton Centre, where it performed with several Dalek props operated by their exhibitors.
 7–11 April – The Gadget Show Live. Titan was used for comedy purposes during the annual "The Gadget Show Live Super Theatre" shows at the NEC in Birmingham.
 2 December – JLS. Titan joined a 40-day tour with JLS, appearing on stage to the track "Superhero".

2011 
 The Gadget Show. Cyberstein confirmed on Facebook page that Titan will be used in an episode of The Gadget Show 11th series. In photos it is believed that it is in a sketch with Suzi Perry and Jason Bradbury.
 15–17 April – The Gadget Show Live. Titan was also used at The Gadget Show Live as a feature in the super theater. There were also two other Titan robots that looked like the original. These were believed to be called Titan 2 and Titan 3.
 10 November – Natholdet, Danish TV2. While in Denmark for the BEEP gadget expo, Titan visited the Danish late night talk show, where it was to pick the winner of a drawing contest. However, Titan struggled with taking its hand down in the bowl, as its hands were too big and was told to leave the stage after several attempts.

2012 

 9 June - South of England Show Ardingly

2013 
3-7 April - The Gadget Show Live, NEC Birmingham

2014 
7–23 February – 2014 Winter Olympics, Sochi. Titan performed for 18 days.
12 May – Danilovsky Marketplace, Moscow. Public Titan performance (news in Russian).
 21 August – Clacton Air Show, Essex
 21 August – The N1 Centre, Islington

2015 
 8–10 January – BT Young Scientist and Technology Exhibition

2017 
 31 October–1 November – Microsoft Future Decoded. 
 Butlins. Titan appears at all Butlins resorts in the UK.  Titan arrives being carried on a mini mobility scooter and then puts on a performance in the magic circle after  Dave  turns him on.

2018 
 15 July – Nissan Family Fun Day to celebrate 30 years of Nissan Technical Centre Europe
15–19 April – 2018 Chinese Grand Prix, Shanghai. Titan performed for four days.
23 April-  National Exhibition and Convention Center (Shanghai) Titan Performed At the Opening Ceremony  of His Chinese Office given The Green Card To Perform in China And operated by Tuxuan Robotics
 28 June - Discover Digital event in Telford Southwater.
 5–10  November – China International Import Expo, Shanghai. Titan was exhibited at the UK Pavilion.
 17 November – The Royal Town of Sutton Coldfield Christmas lights, where Titan turned on the town's Christmas lights.

2019
 Titan returned to Butlins in 2019 on selected breaks and school holidays after a 2-year break from the resorts.
 Titan performed at RAF Cosford Air Show in Shropshire on 9 June 2019.
 Titan performed at Chelmsley Wood Shopping Centre on 30 August 2019.
Titan performed at Swami Vivekananda international Convention centre in Mauritius Island on 20–22 September 2019.
Titan performed at National Petroleum Construction Company (NPCC) stand in ADIPEC November, 2019.

2022 

 Titan performed on Britain's Got Talent
 Titan performed at the 2022 RAF Cosford Air Show on 12 June 2022
 Titan performed at cofton holidays annual American car show on 26 June

References

External links

 

2004 clothing
2004 robots
Butlins
Cornish culture
Entertainment robots
Popping dancers
Puppets